The Bougainville Executive Council forms a part of the executive arm of the Autonomous Bougainville Government together with the President of the Autonomous Region of Bougainville.

Current Executive Council

The current executive council was formed after the 2020 Bougainvillean general election.

References

External links
Bougainville Executive Council

Government of the Autonomous Region of Bougainville
Government